Steve Armitage (born 20 June 1944) is a retired British-born Canadian sports reporter, formerly with CBC Sports. He reported on and hosted Hockey Night in Canada broadcasts for the Vancouver Canucks for nearly 30 years, the Canadian Football League and Grey Cup for 30 years, the Olympics including speed skating, swimming and diving, and the World Cup.

Early life and education
Born in High Wycombe, Buckinghamshire, England, UK, he was raised in Victoria, British Columbia and Dartmouth, Nova Scotia. He attended Saint Mary's University, Halifax where he played football quarterback, graduating in 1968 with a Bachelor of Arts degree.

Career
In 1965, he began working at CBC on a part time basis in Halifax, writing the late night sportscast.

In 1973, he moved to Vancouver, joining Bill Good Jr. at CBC Vancouver covering local and national sports.

Armitage won the 1982 ACTRA Foster Hewitt Award for Excellence in Sports Broadcasting and he was nominated for a Gemini Award in 1998 for his coverage of speed skating at the Winter Olympics. In 2006, he was inducted into the BC Sports Hall of Fame.

Armitage was one of the two play-by-play announcers (the other being Nigel Reed) announcing for CBC Sports in the 2007 FIFA U-20 World Cup in Canada. Paul Dolan was the analyst alongside Armitage. He called swimming at the 2008 Summer Olympics for CBC.

Armitage was laid off by the CBC in August 2014 due to cuts to sports programming and the loss of hockey coverage to Rogers Media.
He did, however, return to work for CBC at the 2018 and 2022 Olympics to call events such as long track speed skating. Armitage announced his retirement at the conclusion of the 2022 Winter Olympics.

References

External links 
 CBC biography of Steve Armitage
 

1944 births
Association football commentators
Canadian Football League announcers
Canadian expatriates in England
Canadian colour commentators
Canadian television sportscasters
CBC Television people
English emigrants to Canada
Living people
National Hockey League broadcasters
North American Soccer League (1968–1984) commentators
Olympic Games broadcasters
People from High Wycombe
Players of Canadian football from Nova Scotia
Saint Mary's Huskies football players
Saint Mary's University (Halifax) alumni
Swimming commentators